Henry Boot PLC is a British property development business, listed on the London Stock Exchange. It was floated on the London Stock Exchange in 1919, becoming the first quoted housebuilder. Between the wars, Henry Boot built more houses (public and private) than any other company. The company remains a significant construction and property management company operating in the UK.

History
Henry Boot (1851-1931) was born a farmer's son in the small village of Heeley just outside Sheffield. Henry served a seven-year apprenticeship and worked a total of 20 years with local building firms before he began to work on his own account in 1886. The new business rapidly progressed from jobbing work to larger scale public contracts and housing projects. Henry's eldest son Charles Boot (1874-1945) joined the business after leaving school (presumably not long after the business started) and it was he who transformed Henry Boot & Sons into one of the most successful construction and housing businesses between the wars.

Henry had retired before the outbreak of World War I leaving Charles as managing director. As with so many construction businesses, war expanded the range of contracts: Henry Boot & Sons built the British Army camp at Catterick in Yorkshire; RAF Manston Aerodrome near Ramsgate; the Calshot Naval Air Station at Calshot in Hampshire; Tees Naval Base; a U.S. Army Rest Camp and hospital at Southampton and Chepstow Military Hospital. The company also constructed over one thousand military buildings and over 50 miles of roads and sewers.

Charles Boot was keenly interested in housing and as soon as hostilities ended he began what was to be a major housebuilding programme – both public and private. The company was floated at the end of 1919 to raise £300,000 of new capital to finance these plans. The Prospectus showed the Company operating out of London and Birmingham as well as Sheffield, and it recorded that "Provisional arrangements have been made to proceed at once with several large housing contracts involving the building of some thousands of houses". In the 1920s, housing construction was primarily undertaken for local authorities; at the end of the decade Company accounts stated that some 20,000 houses had been built for local authorities. In the 1930s the emphasis swung to private development and Henry Boot became a substantial developer of housing estates, both for sale and rent. In 1933 First National Trust was formed specifically to develop and administer estates to be let at low rents.

At the beginning of 1935, the Company raised a further £400,000 of preference capital to finance expansion. The Prospectus stated that the company had built around 30,000 houses since 1920. There is some uncertainty as to how many houses were built during the inter-war period. The company's "Brief History" mentions 80,000 but Charles Boot himself referred on separate occasions to lower figures. In 1943 “I have been engaged in building for over fifty years, and my concerns have… built over 60,000 houses; and in 1944 "as a builder of over fifty thousand houses". The 60,000 figure is thought to be the most appropriate. The homes became known as Boot houses; many of them were suffering from carbonatation by the 1980s.

The company's massive housebuilding programme was not to the exclusion of the traditional general construction business. A Paris office was opened immediately after the end of World War I and Boot was engaged in the reconstruction of war-damaged towns. In 1920, offices were opened in Athens and Barcelona. One of the largest contracts of its time was a £10m Greek irrigation contract, awarded in 1927; however, the 1935 Minute Book recorded that ledgers had not been received from Greece and the contract was not finished until 1952. The wide range of construction projects carried out by Boot in the UK and in Europe included harbours, railways, roads, schools and hospitals, but the scheme for which Boot is best known is Pinewood Studios, where work started in 1935.

World War II saw the cessation of housing construction and resources were concentrated on wartime requirements. 1939 had already seen the start of work for all three services and Boot's war effort included aerodromes, ordnance factories and hospital camps. Boot was also one of the major contractors engaged in the construction of Mulberry harbour units.

Charles Boot died in 1945 and the Company never again became the force it had been between the Wars. In particular, housing output remained well below its pre-war levels as management lay in the control of family members more interested in construction: throughout the 1960s Boot averaged no more than 200 houses a year. However, one feature that was unique to Boot was that in 1965 it formed its own building society – The Banner Building Society (Boot had moved its head office to Banner Cross Hall in Sheffield in 1932). Many of the houses that had been built by Boot in the 1930s had been financed with mortgages created by Boot itself and Boot transferred these mortgages into Banner; public deposits were gradually taken into Banner enabling Boot to remove progressively its own capital. This structure was not popular with the Registrar of Friendly Societies and Banner was eventually sold to Midshires Building Society in 1982.

The 1970s saw Henry Boot strengthen its railway engineering business and significantly increase it overseas work. The Company supplied all the trackwork for the Mass Transit Railway in Hong Kong; there were further contracts for the Kowloon-Canton Railway and in Singapore. However, in 1985, the group lost £7m. primarily in overseas construction and in the following year Jamie Boot (the grandson of Charles’ younger brother Edward) was appointed managing director. The emphasis of the group was changed: the traditional railway engineering business was sold in 1988 and private housing development gradually increased – sales had risen to 700 a year by 2001. Two years later, the company cited competing cash demands from the property and plant divisions and the housing division was put up for sale: it was sold to Wilson Bowden for £48m.

Operations
The Group is organised into the following divisions:
 Henry Boot Developments operates in the UK property development market.
 Hallam Land Management is the strategic land and planning promotion arm of the business.
 Henry Boot Construction serving both public and private clients in all construction sectors.
 Banner Plant Limited is a plant hire company.
 Stonebridge Homes Limited is a jointly owned housing business operating in the north of England.
 Road Link (A69) Limited operates a 30-year contract with the Highways Agency to maintain the A69 trunk road.

Legal issues
Henry Boot Developments Ltd. developed a retail facility and petrol station at junction 11 on the M20 motorway, which was tenanted by Food Co UK LLP, trading as Muffin Break. Estimated usage was predicted by Henry Boot Developments at 80,000 visitors per week, which turned out to be an overly optimistic forecast. The tenant took Henry Boot Developments to court alleging fraudulent misrepresentation about the extent that motorway signage could be provided from the M20, about predicted visitor numbers, and about the scale of the facilities that could be offered. The court rejected Food Co UK's claims because Henry Boot Developments had made statements based on reasonable grounds.

References

Construction and civil engineering companies established in 1886
Construction and civil engineering companies of the United Kingdom
Companies based in Sheffield
1886 establishments in England
British companies established in 1886